QDevelop is a free software integrated development environment specialized on the Qt4 framework and C++.
It uses gcc for building and gdb for debugging.

It supports Source code editor with syntax highlighting with native support for Qt Keywords and integrates different Qt Tools such as Qt Designer and qmake. QDevelop's Editor features code completion and automatic indentation. There's also a project management system and a class browser that enables the programmer to navigate through classes and data structures.

See also
 Qt Creator
 Comparison of integrated development environments

External links
 QDevelop on Google Code.

Cross-platform software
Integrated development environments
Free integrated development environments
Linux integrated development environments
Cross-platform free software
Free software programmed in C++
Software that uses Qt
Software using the GPL license